Caesar Felton "Zip" Gayles (May 22, 1900 – November 5, 1986) was an American football and basketball coach.  He served as the head football coach at Tennessee Agricultural & Industrial State College—now known as Tennessee State University—in 1927, Arkansas Agricultural, Mechanical & Normal College—now known as University of Arkansas at Pine Bluff–from 1928 to 1929, and at Langston University from 1930 to 1957, compiling a career college football record of 155–89–23. 
He was also the head basketball coach at Langston from 1930 to 1965, tallying a mark of 571–281.  Gayles was inducted into the Oklahoma Athletic Hall of Fame in 1974, the NAIA Basketball Coaches Hall of Fame in 1986, and the National Collegiate Basketball Hall of Fame in 2015.

Coaching career

Tennessee A&I
After graduating, Gayles took a faculty and coaching position at Tennessee Agricultural & Industrial State College in Nashville, Tennessee, now called Tennessee State University.  As the fourth head coach of the football, he led the squad to a record of 1–2–3 in 1927.

Some records list his name as "Felton Gale" at this time but other records confirm that "Felton Gale" and "Caesar Felton Gayles" are indeed the same person.

Arkansas–Pine Bluff
Gayles was the head football coach at Arkansas Agricultural, Mechanical & Normal College—now known as the University of Arkansas at Pine Bluff—for two seasons, from 1928 to 1929, compiling a record of 8–9–3.

Langston
Gayles coached for 35 years at Langston University in Langston, Oklahoma.  As the basketball coach from 1930 to 1965, his teams compiled a record of 571–281. He also was the football coach for 28 seasons, from 1930 to 1957, finishing with a record of 146–78–18. His teams were National Negro champions twice in both basketball and football.

Death
Gayles died on November 5, 1986, in Muskogee, Oklahoma.

Head coaching record

Football

References

1900 births
1986 deaths
Arkansas–Pine Bluff Golden Lions football coaches
Langston Lions football coaches
Langston Lions basketball coaches
Morehouse Maroon Tigers football players
Tennessee State Tigers football coaches
African-American coaches of American football
African-American players of American football
African-American basketball coaches
20th-century African-American sportspeople